Infinita Symphonia is an Italian symphonic metal and heavy metal band, founded in Rome during 2008.
The band released a demo album in 2009, under the name "Into the Symphonia", from which they got good fame. Their debut album, "A Mind's Chronicle", was released in 2011 and was followed by their second studio effort, "Infinita Symphonia", on June 18, 2013.

The band performs in Rome's local stages and in known and lesser known Italian music festivals.

Band members
 Luca Micioni – Singer
 Gianmarco Ricasoli – Electric guitar, Backing Vocals
 Ivan Daniele – Drum
 Alberto de Felice – Bass guitar
–Ex members:
 Claudio Metalli – Keyboard
 Luca Ciccotti – Drum

Albums

A Mind's Chronicle, 2011 (57:35 min)
 1. Intro(verted) – 01:38
 2. Lost in My Own Brain – 04:26
 3. Mighty Storm – 05:15
 4. The Illusion – 05:31
 5. Planet Universe – 05:22
 6. Here There's No Why (feat. Fabio Lione) – 05:19
 7. Only One Reason (feat. Tim "Ripper" Owens)	06:16
 8. Lost And Found – 05:05
 9. From Earth To Heaven – 05:37
 10. The Equation of The End – 05:52
 11. I Believe in You – 7:14

Infinita Symphonia, 2013
 1. If I Could Go Back
 2. The Last Breath (Slideshow)
 3. Welcome to My World
 4. Drowsiness
 5. In Your Eyes
 6. Fly (feat. Michael Kiske)
 7. Interlude
 8. Waiting for a Day of Happiness
 9. X IV
 10. Limbo

Demo

Into the Symphonia, 2009 (33:23 min)
 1. Mighty Storm – 05:14
 2. The Illusion (Quiete) – 05:11
 3. From Earth to Heaven (Lost Love) – 05:37
 4. We Fight Trough Metal Sound – 03:31
 5. Intro(spection), instrumental – 01:20
 6. I Believe in You – 06:53
 7. From Earth to Heaven – 5:37

Italian heavy metal musical groups
Musical groups from Rome
Italian symphonic metal musical groups
Scarlet Records artists